Katrina Price (December 3, 1975 – January 18, 1999) was an American basketball player. A star guard in her college career at Stephen F. Austin State University, Price committed suicide after her rookie season in professional basketball.

High school career 
In 1994, Price was named Central Texas Player of the Year and co-Most Valuable Player for Central Texas Female Athlete of the Year. She was also a class salutatorian with a 4.25 GPA. In her senior year she led La Vega High School (Waco, Texas) to the 1994 state finals and a 32–4 record, and averaged 30.0 points, 13.0 rebounds, 6.0 assists, and 5.0 steals per game. The previous year, she was named 1993 Volleyball MVP of District 17-3A, for her performance in that sport.

College career 
In her Division I NCAA career, Price was Stephen F. Austin State University's all-time leading scorer with 2,278 career points and the Southland Conference player of the year in 1997 and 1998. A 5'-10" guard, she was a third-team AP All-American (first team Academica All American) selection her senior season (1997–1998), averaging 22.1 points and 5.3 rebounds a game. As of 2001 Price held the record for most three-point field goals in a single championship game, with seven, in a game against the University of Toledo in 1997.

Price excelled academically as well as athletically. In high school, she was second in her graduating class, and she made the Dean's List every semester she was in college.

USA Basketball 
Price competed with USA Basketball as a member of the 1997 Jones Cup Team that won the silver medal in Taipei. Several of the games were close, with the USA team winning four games by six points or fewer, including an overtime game in the semifinal match against Japan. The gold medal game against South Korea was also close, but the USA fell 76–71 to claim the silver medal for the event. Price averaged 3.0 points per game.

Professional career 
Price was drafted seventh overall pick by the Long Beach Stingrays in the 1998 American Basketball League draft, but the team disbanded before she could play a game. She was assigned to the Philadelphia Rage roster in August. She was a reserve guard, playing in 12 of the Rage's 14 games before the league shut down in late December.

Death 
Price died in Nacogdoches, Texas, at the age of 23, of a self-inflicted shotgun wound to the head.

See also 
List of basketball players who died during their careers

References 

1975 births
1999 suicides
All-American college women's basketball players
American women's basketball players
Philadelphia Rage players
Point guards
Stephen F. Austin Ladyjacks basketball players
Suicides by firearm in Texas
1999 deaths
20th-century American women
20th-century American people